Lama Dorji, or Lama Darja (1726 or 1728–1753) was a mid-eighteenth century khan or ruler of the Dzungar Khanate, a confederation of Mongol tribes that ruled over most of present-day Xinjiang and part of eastern Kazakhstan, Kyrgyzstan and southern Siberia. He was the eldest son of Galdan Tseren, Khong Tayiji of the Dzungar Khanate from 1727 until his death in 1745. Before his death, Galdan Tseren had designated his second son Tsewang Dorji Namjal to succeed him. However, a succession dispute soon erupted among Galdan Tseren's three sons.

Lama Dorji conspired with the husband of his sister Ulam Bayar, the Baghatur Sayin Bolek and other saisans or high officials, to kill Tsewang Dorji Namjal while he was on a hunting trip. During an abortive attack on the plotters in 1750, Tsewang Dorji Namjal was captured and blinded then sent as a prisoner to Aksu, Xinjiang along with his brother, Tsewang Dashi.

Despite his low birth as a Khoit, Lama Dorji's encountered little opposition except from the Dzungar Khan, Dawachi, grandson of Khong Tayiji and Tsewang Rabtan's cousin Tsering Dhondup. In 1751, Lama Dorji defeated Dawachi, who was forced to flee across the border into Kazakh Khanate territory with about a dozen men. Amursana was one of Dawachi's few followers who returned to Tarbagatai to join up with his Khoit clansmen. With a thousand men, he then marched to Ili where they surprised Lama Dorji and killed him on 13January 1753. Other sources claim that Lama Dorji was killed by his own troops in December 1752. Dawachi then assumed the title taisha of the Dzungars.

See also
Dzungar–Qing Wars

References

Dzungar Khanate
18th-century Mongol rulers
Tibetan Buddhist monks
1720s births
1753 deaths